The Harrison was an American automobile built in Grand Rapids, Michigan originally by the Harrison Wagon Company from 1905 through 1906. The company was renamed to the Harrison Motor Car Company in 1907.

History

The 1906 and 1907 models featured a self-starting system which introduced acetylene into the proper cylinder for starting 'on the spark'. The cars came with a four-cylinder engine of 6.3L in capacity, with overhead valves. Pushrods for the exhaust valves had a ring-shaped section so they could straddle the exhaust piping.

References
 

Defunct motor vehicle manufacturers of the United States
Motor vehicle manufacturers based in Michigan
Defunct manufacturing companies based in Michigan